Rita Giuliana Mannella is the Italian Ambassador to Sri Lanka having presented her credentials to President Maithripala Sirisena on December 3, 2018.  She is also ambassador to the Maldives.

Mannella is a graduate of the University of Pisa.

References

Italian women ambassadors
University of Pisa alumni
Living people
Ambassadors of Italy
Ambassadors to the Maldives
Ambassadors to Sri Lanka
Italian diplomats
21st-century diplomats
Year of birth missing (living people)